Šalčininkai Manor is a former Vagneriai residential manor in Šalčininkai city, Šalčininkai District Municipality, Lithuania.

References

Manor houses in Lithuania